The Boss is the second studio album by Russian rapper Timati, released on November 13, 2009.

Overview
It is the first Russian hip hop release to have multiple American guest features and collaborations. Both artists and producers including names such as Busta Rhymes, Xzibit, Mario Winans, Snoop Dogg, etc.

Track listing

References
Феномен Тимати (часть 1)
Тимати и Snoop Dogg зажгли в Германии

Интервью с Тимати
Тимати и Снуп Догг о совместной работе и новом альбоме
Diddy, Snoop Dogg и Тимати…где связь?…мы отвечаем
Пресс-релиз альбома Тимати + подробности трека с Busta Rhymes!

2009 albums
Timati albums